Arnold Transit Company was a ferry boat company serving Mackinac Island in Michigan for 140 years.  In late 2016 Arnold Line's Assets including the boats, docks along with its name were purchased by Star Line Mackinac Island Ferry Service , who continues to operate it today.

History
Arnold Transit Company was started in 1878 by George Arnold (1846-1921). Coal-fire steamboats transported passengers and goods for almost 70 years to various Michigan ports and islands. Mrs. Arnold brought in Otto Lang and Prentiss Brown to manage the business.

After World War II, Arnold Transit Company, now owned by Lang and Brown, started to add modern diesel boats to its fleet. In June 1946, Arnold, which ran from Mackinaw City to Mackinac, merged with Island Transportation Company which ran a St. Ignace to Mackinac Island route.  In 1984, a long-standing competitor, the Mackinac Transportation Company, ended operations.  In 1987, the first of three catamaran ferries was added to the Arnold Line fleet.

In 2010, after decades of ownership, the Brown family announced the sale of Arnold Transit parent company Union Terminal Piers to James Wynn.  In 2014, the company suffered financially and the investment group backing Wynn foreclosed. The foreclosure resulted in the public auction of two catamarans. Competitor Star Line Mackinac Island Ferry Service purchased one of the Catamarans, the M/V Mackinac Express, Pictured Rocks Cruises purchased the M/V Island Express and was renamed M/V Pictured Rocks Express, the M/V Straits Express, is now in New York City being used as a commuter ferry for Hornblower Cruises. Wynn was removed as president and from his position on the board of directors, and operations were taken over by the original investment group out of Cincinnati, Ohio.

In September 2015, an agreement was reached to ensure the company's continued access between its Mackinac Island dock and Main Street, which had been lost in a land deal engineered by Wynn.

In November 2016, competitor Star Line Mackinac Island Ferry Service  announced it would be purchasing the majority of the assets of Arnold Transit Company, including boats, boatyard, its docks and name. The Arnold assets were incorporated into the Star Line fleet for the 2017 season and Arnold Line continues to operation under the Star Line Ferry Company name after 140 years.

Fleet
Traditional Ferries:  M/V Chippewa, M/V Algoma, M/V Huron, M/V Ottawa, and M/V Straits of Mackinac II.
Non-Passenger Freight: M/V Corsair ,  M/V The Senator, and M/V Mackinac Islander.
Catamaran: M/V Mackinac Express, M/V Island Express, and M/V Straits Express.

See also
Ferries in Michigan

References

External links
 http://www.mlive.com/business/west-michigan/index.ssf/2015/01/arnold_ferry_adds_luxury_boat.html
 http://www.upnorthlive.com/news/story.aspx?id=1035105
 https://web.archive.org/web/20150924110733/http://www.stignacenews.com/news/2014-01-16/News/Matt_Stuck_Veronica_Dobrowolski_Take_on_New_Roles_.html
 https://web.archive.org/web/20150924110820/http://www.stignacenews.com/news/2014-10-16/News/Isle_Royale_Queen_III_Makes_Island_Run_for_Arnold_.html

Ferry companies of Michigan
Mackinac Island
Transportation in Cheboygan County, Michigan
Transportation in Mackinac County, Michigan
Companies based in Michigan	
Transportation companies of the United States